The Intimidators was the fifteenth novel in the Matt Helm secret agent novel series by Donald Hamilton. It was first published in 1974.

Plot summary
Despite the internal politics of The Intriguers, Matt Helm (code name Eric) still finds himself with plenty of work to do for his boss, Mac. This time he has a two-part mission: kill an enemy agent and then investigate the disappearances of a number of jet-setters within the Bermuda Triangle.

1974 American novels
Matt Helm novels